Brandwatch is a social media suite company owned by Cision. Brandwatch sells two different solutions: Consumer Intelligence and Social Media Management.

Consumer Intelligence is made up of three different products: Consumer Research and add-ons Vizia and Reviews. Consumer Research archives social media data from 100 million online sources to provide companies with the means to conduct market research and analyse their brands' online presence among other use cases.

Social Media Management is made up of eight different products: Publish, Advertise, Measure, Benchmark, Influence, Engage, Audience, and Listen. Much of this solution is made up of products formerly sold under the Falcon.io suite. Falcon.io was acquired by Cision in January 2019 and merged with Brandwatch in May 2022.

History 
In 1999, Runtime Collective Ltd, a web-engineering company, was incorporated by CEO Giles Palmer. In 2005, the company launched Magpie Search and Alert, a search engine for finding documents such as financial statements and patents. In 2007, this was relaunched as Brandwatch, which instead focused on tracking social media mentions and social advertising impact.

Investment 
The company received $6 million in venture capital from Nauta Capital in March 2012. In March 2014, Brandwatch partnered with Gnip, a social media API company, to release a new application that would allow users to access more social data and analytics. By May 2014, Brandwatch had gained $22 million from a new round of funding led by Highland Capital. In September 2015, Brandwatch launched a French website., On October 29, 2015, Brandwatch raised $33 million in Series C funding, led by Partech Investors, to invest further growth in the US. In February 2021, Brandwatch was acquired by Cision.

PeerIndex acquisition 

PeerIndex was a London-based company, founded by Azeem Azhar, providing social media analytics based on footprints from use of major social media services. Part of an emerging group of social media analytics providers, PeerIndex helped social media contributors assess and score their influence and benefit from the social capital they have built up. PeerIndex tracked approximately 45 million Twitter profiles, making the company one of the leaders in its sector.

Brandwatch acquired PeerIndex in December 2014. With the use of PeerIndex technology, Brandwatch created their Audiences product, which they released in July 2016.

BuzzSumo acquisition 
BuzzSumo is a content marketing research and analysis tool, with its first Pro version released in September 2014. Brandwatch acquired BuzzSumo in October 2017.

Crimson Hexagon merger 
Crimson Hexagon was a social intelligence company that was a competitor of Brandwatch. The two companies merged in October 2018, combining their technology and customer base into a $100m business.

Brandwatch Consumer Research 
Following the Brandwatch-Crimson Hexagon merger, the two companies' technology was combined to create Brandwatch Consumer Research. This product would replace Brandwatch Analytics and Crimson Hexagon's Forsight.

Qriously acquisition 
Qriously is a mobile market research, polling, and survey tool. The tool has been notable in its use of predicting a highly accurate prediction for the Labour Party (UK)'s vote share in the 2017 United Kingdom general election. Qriously, along with Kantar and Opinium Research, were also praised for their 2019 United Kingdom general election prediction.

Qriously were acquired by Brandwatch in March 2019. It is no longer available for clients.

Cision acquisition 
Brandwatch was acquired in Feb 2021 by Cision for 450M USD.

Falcon.io merge 
Falcon.io was acquired by Cision in January 2019 and merged with Brandwatch in May 2022. Products formerly sold as part of the Falcon.io suite now sit within Brandwatch’s Social Media Management solution.

Overview 
Brandwatch is a subscription-based service with over 7,500 clients.

Brandwatch has 15 offices across the world, including in New York, London, Brighton, Copenhagen, Berlin, Sofia, Paris, Singapore, and Sydney.

Similar metrics
 Cloze.com
 Commun.it
 Engagio
Klout
Q Score

References

External links 
 

Software companies established in 2005
Social media companies
Companies based in Brighton and Hove
British companies established in 2005
2005 establishments in England
Social media management platforms
2021 mergers and acquisitions
British subsidiaries of foreign companies